Ivy is a census-designated place (CDP) in Albemarle County, Virginia, United States. The population as of the 2010 Census was 905.
It is a small unincorporated community located on U.S. Route 250, just west of Charlottesville.

D. S. Tavern, Home Tract, Spring Hill, Woodstock Hall Tavern and Blue Ridge Swim Club are listed on the National Register of Historic Places.

History
Ivy Creek flows through this area of western Albemarle County. It was cited in deeds for land in the Ivy area as early as the 1750s. The village at the present location of Ivy was known as Woodville (for the locally prominent Wood family) between 1826 and 1851. After the arrival of the railroad in 1851, the rail stop at this location was known as Woodville Depot. By 1859, the name had changed to Ivy Depot, probably after Ivy Creek. The village's name was shortened to Ivy in the 1950s.

Climate
Climate is characterized by relatively high temperatures and evenly distributed precipitation throughout the year.  The Köppen Climate Classification subtype for this climate is "Cfa" (Humid Subtropical Climate).

Notable people
Meriwether Lewis
Tom Perriello
Joe Hicks, former Major League Baseball player.
Kyle Long (football) Chicago Bears

References

Census-designated places in Albemarle County, Virginia
Census-designated places in Virginia